Ivan Mahal (born 7 January 1990) is a Belarusian former professional football player.

External links

1990 births
Living people
Association football defenders
Belarusian footballers
FC Dnepr Mogilev players
FC Polotsk players
FC Orsha players
FC Spartak Shklov players
FC Osipovichi players